The Khazar Lankaran 2010–11 season is Khazar Lankaran's sixth Azerbaijan Premier League season. It was Khazar's first season under Mircea Rednic. Khazar finished the season in 2nd place and also competed in and won the Azerbaijan Cup. Due to their 3rd-placed finish the previous season, Khazar entered the Europa League at the first qualifying round stage where they were knocked out by FC Olimpia of Moldova.

Squad

Transfers

Summer

In:

 

 

Out:

Winter

In:

Out:

Competitions

Azerbaijan Premier League

First round

Results

Table

Championship group

Results

Table

Azerbaijan Cup

Europa League

Qualifying rounds

Notes
Note 6: Played in Chișinău at Zimbru Stadium as Olimpia's Olimpia Bălţi Stadium did not meet UEFA criteria.

Squad statistics

Appearances and goals

|-
|colspan="14"|Players who appeared for Khazar Lankaran who left during the season:

|}

Goal scorers

Disciplinary record

References

External links 
 Khazar Lankaran at Soccerway.com

Khazar Lankaran FK seasons
Khazar Lankaran